The Elliott and Anna Barham House is a historic residence in Zinc, Arkansas. It is listed on the National Register of Historic Places. It was the home of Elliott Barham, son of the founder of Zinc, Arkansas, and his wife, Anna Barham.

Description
The house, located at 4085 West Street, is a narrow -story wood-frame cottage, with a symmetrical front framed by gingerbread decoration and a porch with turned posts. Built into the side of a hill, its stone-walled basement is fully exposed on the south side. Constructed in 1917, it is a well-preserved local example of Folk Victorian design.

The house was listed on the National Register of Historic Places on January 21, 2004.

See also

 National Register of Historic Places listings in Boone County, Arkansas

References

External links

Houses on the National Register of Historic Places in Arkansas
Houses completed in 1917
Houses in Boone County, Arkansas
National Register of Historic Places in Boone County, Arkansas
1917 establishments in Arkansas
Victorian architecture in Arkansas